This is a list of awards and nominations received by American rapper ASAP Rocky.

BBC Sound of...

|-
|2011
|Himself
|Sound of 2012
|
|}

BET Awards

BET Awards

|-
|2012
|rowspan="3"|Himself
|Best New Artist
|
|-
|rowspan="5"|2013
|Best Male Hip-Hop Artist
|
|-
|Video Director of the Year
|
|-
|rowspan="3"|"Fuckin' Problems"
|Video of the Year
|
|-
|Best Collaboration
|
|-
|Viewer's Choice
|
|}

BET Hip Hop Awards

|-
|rowspan="6"|2012
|rowspan="3"|Himself
|Rookie of the Year
|
|-
|Best Live Performer
|
|-
|Made-You-Look Award
|
|-
|"Goldie"
|Best Hip Hop Video
|
|-
|LIVE.LOVE.A$AP 
|Best Mixtape
|
|-
|Himself (with Sam Lecca)
|rowspan="2"|Video Director of the Year
|
|-
|rowspan="6"|2013
|Himself (with A$AP Ferg)
|
|-
|rowspan="4"|"Fuckin' Problems" (featuring Drake, 2 Chainz and Kendrick Lamar)
|Best Collaboration, Duo or Group
|
|-
|Best Hip-Hop Video
|
|-
|People's Champ Award
|
|-
|Best Club Banger
|
|-
|rowspan="4"|Himself
|rowspan="4"|Made-You-Look Award
|
|-
|2014
|
|-
|2015
|
|-
|2016
|
|}

Grammy Awards

|-
|2014
|"Fuckin' Problems"
|Best Rap Song
|
|-
|2016
|"LSD"
|Best Music Video
|

MTV Awards

MTV Europe Music Awards

|-
|rowspan="2"|2012
|rowspan="2"|Himself
|US Artist About To Go Global
|
|-
|Best Look
|
|}

MTV Video Music Awards

|-
|2012
|"Goldie"
|Best Editing
|
|-
|2013
|"Fuckin' Problems"
|Best Hip-Hop Video
|
|-
|2015
|"L$D"
| Best Editing
|
|-
|2020
|"Babushka Boi"
| Best Art Direction
|
|-
|}

MTV Video Music Awards Japan

|-
|2013
|"Fuckin' Problems"
|Best Hip-Hop Video
|
|}

mtvU Woodie Awards

|-
|2014
|"Wild for the Night"
|Best Collaboration Woodie
|
|}

World Music Awards

|-
|rowspan="6"|2014
|rowspan="3"|Himself
|World's Best Male Artist
|
|-
|World's Best Entertainer of the Year
|
|-
|World's Best Live Act
|
|-
|rowspan="2"|"Fuckin' Problems"
|World's Best Song
|
|-
|World's Best Video
|
|-
|Long. Live. ASAP
|World's Best Album
|
|-
|}

References

External links
 

ASAP Rocky